Rockland Key is an island in the lower Florida Keys about  east of Key West.

U.S. 1 (the Overseas Highway) crosses the edge of the key at approximately mile markers 8–9.5, between Boca Chica Key and Big Coppitt Key.

It is located directly across the Overseas Highway from East Rockland Key.

References

Islands of Monroe County, Florida
Islands of the Florida Keys
Islands of Florida